Bhargav Bhatt (born 13 May 1990) is a cricketer who plays for Baroda in Indian domestic cricket. He is a slow left-arm orthodox bowler. He also plays for Kings XI Punjab in Indian Premier League.

Bhatt, in his debut first-class season, picked up 47 wickets from 9 matches to become the highest wicket-taker of the season. His impressive showing was awarded, as he got an IPL contract with the Kings XI Punjab franchise in 2011. He continued his good run in the Twenty20 format too with economic bowling. He had figures of 2.5-0-22-4 against Mumbai Indians for which he earned the Man-of-the-Match award.

He was the leading wicket-taker for Andhra in the 2017–18 Ranji Trophy, with 27 dismissals in six matches. He was also the leading wicket-taker for Baroda in the 2018–19 Ranji Trophy, with 31 dismissals in eight matches.

References

External links 

1990 births
Living people
Indian cricketers
Andhra cricketers
Baroda cricketers
West Zone cricketers
Punjab Kings cricketers
India Blue cricketers
India Red cricketers
People from Vadodara